The Troyekurovo Cemetery, alternatively known as Novo-Kuntsevo Cemetery, is a cemetery in Moscow, Russia.

The cemetery is located in the former village of Troyekurovo on the western edge of Moscow, which derives its name from the Troyekurov princely family, a branch of the Rurikid House of Yaroslavl, that owned the village in the 17th century. Troyekurovo Cemetery includes the Church of Saint Nicholas, built by Prince Troyekurov in 1699–1704, which was closed during the Soviet era but reopened in 1991.

Troyekurovo Cemetery is administered as a branch of the Novodevichy Cemetery and is the resting place of numerous notable Russian and Soviet figures.

Notable people buried at the Troyekurovo Cemetery

Notable graves

 Nina Alisova, Russian actress
 Gennady Bachinsky, Russian radio talk show host and producer
 Grigory Baklanov, Russian writer
 George Blake, Soviet spy who defected from the United Kingdom
 Alexei Bogomolov, radio engineer, Hero of Socialist Labour, Lenin Prize, USSR State Prize
 Viktor Bortsov, Soviet/Russian theatrical and cinema actor
 Galina Dzhugashvili, Russian translator of French, granddaughter of Joseph Stalin
 Semyon Farada, Russian actor
 Vitaly Fedorchuk, former KGB chief
 Konstantin Feoktistov, Russian cosmonaut
 Vladislav Galkin, Russian film actor
 Vasily Grossman, Soviet-era writer and journalist
 Natalya Gundareva, Russian actress
 Roman Abelevich Kachanov, Russian animator
 Dmitry Kholodov, journalist of the Russian newspaper Moskovskij Komsomolets, killed as he was investigating alleged corruption among high ranks of the Russian military
 Elem Klimov, Soviet Russian film director
 Vyacheslav Kochemasov, diplomat
 Andrey Kozlov, was the first deputy chairman of the Central Bank of the Russian Federation from 1997 to 1999 and again in 2002 to 2006
 Ilya Kormiltsev, Russian poet, translator, and publisher
 Konstantin Krylov, nationalist writer, journalist and philosopher
 Alfred Kuchevsky (1931–2000), Soviet professional ice hockey player
 Sergey Kurdyumov, specialist in mathematical physics, mathematical modeling, plasma physics, complexity studies and synergetic
 Mikhail Lapshin, President of the Altai Republic in Russia from 2002 to 2006
 Yuri Levada, Russian sociologist and politologist
 Alexander Lenkov, Russian film, stage and voice actor.
 Anatoly Lysenko, Russian television figure, journalist, director, producer.
 Sergey Mavrodi, MMM Leader
 Georgy Millyar, Russian film actor
 Yelena Mukhina, Soviet Gymnast. (1960–2006)
 Yulia Nachalova, Russian singer and actor
 Vyacheslav Nevinny, Russian actor
 Arsha Ovanesova, Soviet Armenian documentary film director, and screenplay writer.
 Galina Pisarenko, Soviet-born Russian soprano and teacher
 Anna Politkovskaya, murdered Russian journalist, author and human rights activist well known for her opposition to the Chechen conflict and Russian President Vladimir Putin
 Lyubov Polishchuk, Russian actress. (1951–2008)
 Pavel Popovich, the 8th person in space
 Anatoly Pristavkin, Russian writer
 Yuli Raizman, Russian film director
 Boris Rybakov, Soviet archaeologist and historian
 Genrikh Sapgir, Russian poet
 Daniil Shafran, Jewish Russian cellist
 Natalia Shvedova, Russian lexicographer
 Sergei Suponev, TV host. (1965–2003)
 Valentina Tolkunova, Russian singer
 Yevgeny Vesnik, Russian actor
 Boris Zakhoder, Russian children's writer
 Sergey Zalygin, Russian novelist

Public and political figures
 Yevgeny Bushmin, Russian economist, politician
 Anatoly Lukyanov, Chairman of the Supreme Soviet of the Soviet Union
 Viktor Chebrikov, Soviet Union spy and head of the KGB from 1982 to 1988
 Vitaly Fedorchuk, Ukrainian Soviet administrator. He was chairman of the KGB in 1982. He then became the Soviet interior minister from 1982 until 1986
 Boris Fyodorov, Russian economist, politician, and reformer
 Aleksandr Kamshalov, member of the Communist Party of the Soviet Union and head of the State Committee for Cinematography in the Soviet Union
 Andrei Kirilenko, leading official of the Communist Party of the Soviet Union in the 1960s, 1970s and early 1980s
 Gennady Kolbin, First Secretary of the Central Committee of the Communist Party of Kazakh SSR
 Nikolay Kruchina, top Soviet communist official, the administrator of affairs of the Central Committee
 Vladimir Kryuchkov, Soviet politician and leading figure in Communist Party of the Soviet Union and Chairman of KGB, dismissed in 1991 for his role in the failed August Coup against Soviet President and Leader Mikhail Gorbachev
 Pyotr Latyshev, Presidential Envoy to Urals Federal District, Russia
 Yuri Maslyukov, the last Gosplan chairman
 Boris Nemtsov, Russian opposition politician
 Boris Pugo, Latvian Communist political figure
 Vladimir Semichastny, Chief of the KGB from November 1961 to April 1967
 Georgy Shakhnazarov, Soviet politician and political scientist
 Larisa Shoygu, Russian politician, deputy of the State Duma (2007–21)
 Anatoly Tyazhlov, Russian politician who served as the governor of Moscow Oblast from 1991 until 2000
 Alexander Yakovlev, Russian economist, chief of party ideology, sometimes called the "godfather of glasnost"
 Gennady Yanayev, the only vice president of the Soviet Union

Military
 Sergey Akhromeyev, Hero of the Soviet Union (1982), Marshal of the Soviet Union (1983)
 Galaktion Alpaidze, Soviet lieutenant general and first director of the Plesetsk Cosmodrome
 Timur Apakidze, Russian major general, deputy commander of naval aviation and Hero of the Russian Federation
 Aleksey Botyan, Hero of the Russian Federation (2007), Second World War partisan and intelligence officer
 Vladimir Bogdashin, naval officer, rear admiral, captain of the frigate Bezzavetnyy during the 1988 Black Sea bumping incident.
 Yuri Drozdov, a high-level Soviet and Russian security official who oversaw the KGB's Illegals Program from 1979 to 1991.
 Vasily Dzhugashvili, general, son of Joseph Stalin and his second wife, Nadezhda Alliluyeva
 Vitaly Margelov, colonel general, intelligence officer
 Natalya Meklin, World War II bomber pilot and Heroine of the Soviet Union
 Vladimir Muravyov, colonel general of the Strategic Missile Forces
 Yevdokiya Pasko, Heroine of the Soviet Union from the 46th Guards Night Bomber Aviation Regiment
 Aleksey Prokhorov, twice Hero of the Soviet Union, major-general
 Lev Rokhlin, Lieutenant-General in the Soviet and Russian armies
 Igor Sergeyev, Defense Minister of the Russian Federation from 1997 until 2001. He was the first and as of 2008 the only Marshal of the Russian Federation.
 Yevgeny Shaposhnikov, Marshal of Aviation, final Defence Minister of the Soviet Union
 Leonid Shcherbakov, Lieutenant-General, Hero of the Russian Federation
 Boris Snetkov, Army General in the Soviet and Russian armies
 Lev Skvirsky, commander of the 26th Army
 Aleksandr Starovoitov, Army General, Hero of the Russian Federation
 Ivan Ustinov, Soviet general-lieutenant, counterintelligence officer
 Valentin Varennikov, Soviet General of the Army, Hero of the Soviet Union
 Ivan Vertelko, Soviet Colonel General
 Mikhail Vodopyanov, Soviet aircraft pilot, one of the first Heroes of the Soviet Union, and a Major General of the Soviet Air Force
 Mikhail Zaitsev, Soviet General of the Army, Hero of the Soviet Union

References

External links
 
 List of graves and pictures of the Troyekurovo Cemetery 
 

Cemeteries in Moscow
Christianity in Moscow
Eastern Orthodox cemeteries